Władysław Piecyk is a Polish retired slalom canoeist who competed from the late 1950s to the mid-1960s. He won two medals in the folding K-1 team event at the ICF Canoe Slalom World Championships with a silver in 1963 and a bronze in 1961.

References

Polish male canoeists
Possibly living people
Year of birth missing (living people)
Place of birth missing (living people)
Medalists at the ICF Canoe Slalom World Championships